Bree Mills (born July 15, 1981) is an American adult film director, writer and producer.  Head of production company Gamma Films and Chief Creative Officer for Gamma Entertainment.

Having begun her career in Adult Entertainment in 2009 with Gamma Entertainment as a Marketing Director, Mills moved on to become the head of creative content six years later to create Gamma's websites Girlsway and PureTaboo and most recently her newly launched master brand Adult Time.

Early life 
Mills was born in 1981 in Boston, Massachusetts and Canadian-raised in London, Ontario, Canada and graduated from London Central Secondary School. Raised by a gay parent who came out when she was 8 years old, Mills was able to grow up in an openly accepting environment while exploring her own sexuality. A great lover of film, Mills considers herself a pop culture vulture; "I've watched a lot of films, read a lot of books, and watched a lot of television. It's in my genes." Allowing pop culture to influence her work, Mills creative inspiration comes from various sources from which she draws to craft her concepts. A creative remembering of her earlier years has been captured in Teenage Lesbian, which was released on Adult Time in September 2019.

In 2021, she founded Disruptive Films, a gay focused production label. She directed "The Last Course," first film under the banner.

Personal life 
Mills identifies as lesbian, she married former pornographic actress Sara Luvv in December, 2017.

Filmography 
Selected filmography

Awards 
 Director of the year  (Body of Work) - XBIZ 2018
 Director of the Year (Feature Release) - XBIZ 2018
 Best New Studio (Pure Taboo) - XBIZ 2018
 Best Director (Features) - XRCO 2018 
 Director of the Year (Body of Work) - XBIZ 2019
 Studio of the Year (Gamma Films) - XBIZ 2019

References

Further reading

External links 

 

 USBC Film Class to Q&A 
 The Power of Acting 
 Porn Worth Paying For

Living people
American pornographic film directors
American pornographic film producers
Women pornographic film producers
American women film directors
American women film producers
Film directors from Massachusetts
1981 births
21st-century American women
People from Boston